Lanexa is an unincorporated community  partially in New Kent County, and partially in James City County,  Virginia, United States.  The ZIP Code for Lanexa is 23089.  Lanexa is located by the Chickahominy River and has many tourism sites for camping and outdoor activities. Diascund Creek runs immediately to the east of the center of Lanexa. A dam creates the Diascund Creek Reservoir on the north side of the community.

In the late nineteenth and early twentieth century, Lanexa had a station on the Peninsula Extension of the Chesapeake and Ohio Railway near where the tracks run along the Chickahominy River west of Diascund Creek. Today, the main artery is US Route 60.

References

GNIS reference

Unincorporated communities in Virginia
Unincorporated communities in New Kent County, Virginia
Unincorporated communities in James City County, Virginia